Ridgwardine is a small hamlet in Shropshire in the civil parish of Norton in Hales. It is made up of Ridgwardine Manor, Upper Farm, and Manor Farm.

References

Villages in Shropshire